The Abraham Lincoln Memorial Bridge can also refer to the Blair Bridge in Iowa and Nebraska. There is also a Lincoln Memorial Bridge in Vincennes, Indiana.

Abraham Lincoln Memorial Bridge in Illinois is a four-lane bidirectional road bridge that spans the Illinois River, Illinois Route 351, Illinois and Michigan Canal, and local roads and railroads. It carries Interstate 39 (I-39), a major north-south Interstate through central Illinois, and its U.S. Route counterpart, U.S. Route 51 (US 51).

Description
The bridge crosses the river between LaSalle and Oglesby, at river mile 225.8. The structure comprises a main span over the river, flanked by 43 approach spans. It is named after Abraham Lincoln, the sixteenth president of the United States. Its length makes it the longest bridge in Illinois.

History 

The bridge was built in 1987 when I-39 was first extended south to what is now Illinois Route 251. The highway itself has since been extended all the way to the Bloomington–Normal.

See also 
 
 
 
 List of crossings of the Illinois River

References 

Bridges completed in 1987
U.S. Route 51
Interstate 39
Through arch bridges in the United States
Bridges over the Illinois River
Bridges in LaSalle County, Illinois
Monuments and memorials in Illinois
Bridges on the Interstate Highway System
1987 establishments in Illinois
Bridges of the United States Numbered Highway System
Arch bridges in the United States
Steel bridges in the United States
Road bridges in Illinois
Monuments and memorials to Abraham Lincoln in the United States